Hong Kongers in the United Kingdom (also known as Hong Kong Britons) are people from Hong Kong who are residing in the United Kingdom or British citizens of Hong Kong origin or descent.

Background
The United Kingdom has historically been a popular destination for Hong Kong immigrants due to the colonial relationship between the two territories. The British Nationality Act 1948 allowed Hong Kong-born residents to move to the UK free of restriction. The UK's popularity among immigrants was also helped by the fact that the English language enjoys official status in both territories. While many Hong Kong-born residents of the UK are ethnically Chinese, others include the children of colonial parentage (British and/or other European heritage, and people with ancestries from other parts of the former British colonial empire) born in Hong Kong prior to the transfer of sovereignty to China in 1997.

In June 2020, following the implementation of new security laws in Hong Kong by China, the UK offered a path to residency for British Nationals (Overseas) in Hong Kong. In 2021, 103,900 people applied for the BN(O) visa.

Demographics
The 2001 census recorded 96,445 Hong Kong-born people residing in the United Kingdom. The 2011 census recorded 98,724 Hong Kong-born people resident in England, 3,517 in Wales, 7,586 in Scotland and 1,906 in Northern Ireland. The figure Scotland was 7,068 in 2001 and 5,910 in 1991. The 2021 census recorded 117,714 Hong Kong-born people resident in England, 3,715 in Wales and 1,982 in Northern Ireland. 

Hong Kongers who migrated to the UK under the BN(O) pathway introduced in 2020 are generally older and higher-educated than other immigrants to the UK. According to The Economist, reasons for this demographic include the fact that only people born before 1997 are eligible for British National (Overseas) status, and that families with children are particularly eager to emigrate from Hong Kong following the introduction of the territory's national security law.

Community 
Hong Kong migrants under the BN(O) pathway have created several self-help organisations, including Hongkongers in Britain and the Sutton Hongkongers Group, to support and advocate for each other since the BN(O) path to residency was introduced in 2020. Many of these organisations were set up because many new Hong Kong migrants are afraid of Chinese community groups which are aligned with the government of Communist China.

Notable people
Lydia Dunn, Baroness Dunn
Alan Mak, Conservative Member of Parliament
Sir David Tang, businessman
Nat Wei, Baron Wei
Bob's Your Uncle, YouTube personality
Gemma Chan, actress
Katie Leung, actress
Herman Li, guitarist for DragonForce
 Anna Lo, former politician
Gok Wan, fashion consultant and television presenter
 Benedict Wong, actor
 Tom Wu, actor
 Isobel Yeung, journalist
 Jingan Young, Screenwriter

See also

 British nationality law and Hong Kong
 British Chinese
 British East and Southeast Asian
 British National (Overseas)
 Britons in Hong Kong
 East Asians in the United Kingdom
 Demographics of Hong Kong
 Handover of Hong Kong
 Emigration from Hong Kong

References

External links
 3 Million Hongkongers have the right to live in the UK
 BBC Born Abroad Hong Kong

 

British
United Kingdom
 
Immigration to the United Kingdom by country of origin